Martin Vander Weyer is a British financial journalist, business editor of The Spectator, and a member of the British-American Project.

A Yorkshireman (he lives in Thirsk and Malton) of Flemish ancestry, he is the son of Derek Vander Weyer, who was a London banker with Barclays, where he rose to Deputy Chairman and later was Deputy Chairman of BT.

Martin Vander Weyer spent 15 years in investment banking, working for Schroders and Barclays in London, Brussels and the Far East.

As a journalist, Vander Weyer writes about business, economics and financial morality. He is the business editor and “Any Other Business” columnist of The Spectator as well as editor of the monthly Spectator Business.  He is also a regular contributor to the Daily Telegraph, Sunday Telegraph, Daily Mail and other national publications.
He was previously City editor of The Week.

He is the author of Falling Eagle: the Decline of Barclays Bank (2000), and Closing Balances: Business Obituaries from the Daily Telegraph (2006).

In August 2015, it was announced that Vander Weyer will take up the role of Patron to the York Union at the University of York.

Bibliography

Books

Articles

References 

Living people
The Spectator people
English people of Belgian descent
Schroders people
Year of birth missing (living people)